Baoulé or Baule may refer to:
Baoulé people
Baoulé language

Language and nationality disambiguation pages